Hurricane Creek is a  long 1st order tributary to Brown Creek in Anson County, North Carolina.

Course
Hurricane Creek rises about 0.5 miles north of Pinkston, North Carolina near the Wadesboro airport.  Hurricane Creek then flows northeast to meet Brown Creek about 3.5 miles southeast of Ansonville, North Carolina.

Watershed
Hurricane Creek drains  of area, receives about 47.9 in/year of precipitation, has a topographic wetness index of 500.57 and is about 53% forested.

References

Rivers of North Carolina
Rivers of Anson County, North Carolina
Tributaries of the Pee Dee River